is a mecha multimedia franchise originally created by Sunrise and Red Entertainment. The first series aired on April 15, 1988, replacing the 17:00–17:30 timeslot used for Transformers: The Headmasters. Sunrise credited "Hajime Yatate" for the storyline and Shuji Iuchi directed the series. The series employs a kinetic visual gag style, often employing characters running with their feet over their shoulders derived from Sunrise's previous Super Robot anime series Choriki Robo Galatt.

Story

The series incorporates many elements of RPG games including dungeon levels and quests for magical objects. Soukaizan itself is represented as a series of magical tiered platforms each floating magically above the one beneath it in a rough pyramid shape. In order to progress to the next tier where he will meet the series' ultimate magical villain, the show's heroes must complete some task on the one beneath. In addition to these, he has to defeat the magical ruler of each level along with his many magical henchmen. Each level he completes, rejuvenates one color of the magical gray rainbow over Soukaizan.

In his quest to save the magical realm, Wataru manages to transform a clay sculpture into a somewhat autonomous and small magical Super Robot. He also befriends many of the magical Soukaizan natives, and forms some very strong friendship bonds.  The term Sou-kai-zan can be broken down to its three parts: "Sou" (creation), "Kai" (realm, space, world, or universe), and "Zan" (hill or mountain), representing the pyramid shape of the magical world's level.

Cast
Mayumi Tanaka as Wataru Ikusabe (戦部 ワタル Ikusabe Wataru) (In Keith Courage in Alpha Zones, he is known as Keith Courage)
Megumi Hayashibara as Himiko Shinobibe (忍部 ヒミコ Shinobibe Himiko) (In Keith Courage in Alpha Zones, she is known as Nurse Nancy)
Tomomichi Nishimura as Shibaraku Tsurugibe (剣部 シバラク Tsurugibe Shibaraku) (In Keith Courage in Alpha Zones, he is known as the Weapons Master)
Kōichi Yamadera as Kurama Wataribe (渡部 クラマ Wataribe Kurama)
Kenichi Ogata as Genryūsai Shinobibe (忍部 幻龍斎 Shinobibe Genryūsai)
Tesshō Genda as Ryūjinmaru
Kazue Ikura as Toraoh (虎王 Toraō)
Urara Takano as Umihiko

Episode list

Interpretations
The first section of the title's kanji is a pun: the super-deformed mecha of the series are called "Magic Gods" (Kanji: 魔神, Romaji: mashin) - while written with the kanji for "magic" being shortened from "魔法" (mahō) to "魔" (ma) and "god" (神, shin) ("Shin" is one of two spellings for "jin", one of two romaji for "god" - the second romaji is "kami"), "mashin" is also the romaji for the katakana writing of the ordinary English word "machine" (マシン, mashin). The kanji for "legend", 伝説 (densetsu) is shortened to "伝" (den) before being written alongside "hero" (英雄 Eiyū)

Wataru and his friends Shibaraku and Himiko each represent different elements of ancient Japan: Wataru with his magatama and association with dragons represents the pre-Yamato Watari clan. Shibaraku represents samurai. Himiko represents ninja.

Cultural impact

The anime series was a huge hit in Japan, later being imported into Taiwan, Mainland China, South Korea, France, Monaco and Hong Kong (the latter was shown on TVB Jade). Chinese translations were provided. The show became one of the most famous Japanese anime shows in China during the mid-1990s.

Spin-offs
The franchise has spawned three TV series (Mashin Hero Wataru, Mashin Hero Wataru 2, Cho Mashin Hero Wataru), four radio shows, five OVAs, five novels, five video games, and assorted other merchandise. One of the video games was the original pack-in game for the PC Engine, and was renamed in the United States as Keith Courage in Alpha Zones when localized on TurboGrafx-16.

The latest anime, Mashin Hero Wataru: The Seven Spirits of Ryujinmaru was released online on April 10, 2020. On April 24, 2020, it was announced that the anime would be on a hiatus due to COVID-19. On June 12, 2020, it was announced the anime would resume on June 19, 2020.

Wataru's success prompted Bandai to copy the super-deformed mecha and multi-tiered world concepts in a science fiction setting with Sunrise's 1989 Madō King Granzort TV series.

A manga adaptation drawn by Hideaki Fujii began serialization in Shogakukan's Corocoro Aniki manga magazine in July 2020.

Music

Wataru
 Opening: "Step" by achi-achi
 Ending: "Achi-achi Adventure" by achi-achi
Wataru 2
 Opening 1: "Step by Step" by Takahashi Yumiko
 Ending 1: "Kimi ni Tomaranai - MY GIRL, MY LOVE" by Takahashi Yumiko
 Opening 2: "Fight" by Takahashi Yumiko
 Ending 2: "Niji no Kanata" by Takahashi Yumiko
Cho Mashin Hero Wataru
 Opening 1:  by Hitomi Mieno
 Ending 1: "BOYS BE AMBITIOUS" by Hitomi Mieno
 Opening 2: "POWER OF DREAM" by Hitomi Mieno
 Ending 2: "Ganbatte" by Hitomi Mieno

References

External links
Official Website
Sunrise (Archive)
Bandai Channel (Archive)
Wataru Livejournal Community
VAP
VICTOR
Studio Live page (Shin)

WATARU RAINBOW ISLAND
WATARU IN CHINA/魔神英雄傳 (Archive)

1988 anime television series debuts
1989 anime OVAs
1990 anime television series debuts
1993 anime OVAs
1997 anime television series debuts
2020 anime ONAs
Adventure anime and manga
Anime postponed due to the COVID-19 pandemic
Anime productions suspended due to the COVID-19 pandemic
Bandai Namco franchises
Comedy anime and manga
Fantasy anime and manga
Nippon TV original programming
Seinen manga
Shogakukan manga
Sunrise (company)
Super robot anime and manga
TV Tokyo original programming